The sport of football in the country of Mongolia is run by the Mongolian Football Federation. The association administers the national football team as well as the Niislel League. Football is the second sport of Mongolia, after wrestling.

League system

Mongolia stadiums

References

Football in Mongolia